China National Highway 202 (G202) runs from Heihe in Heilongjiang to Lushunkou in Liaoning. It is 1,818 kilometres in length and runs south from Heihe, going via Harbin and Shenyang.

Route and distance

See also
 China National Highways

202
Transport in Dalian
Transport in Heilongjiang
Transport in Jilin
Transport in Liaoning
Harbin
Jilin City